Minovici is a Romanian-language surname. Notable people with the surname include:

Mina Minovici (1857–1933), Romanian forensic scientist
Nicolae Minovici (1868–1941), Romanian forensic scientist
Ștefan Minovici (1867–1935), Romanian chemist

Romanian-language surnames